Consort An may refer to:

Consort Dowager An (died 949), Shi Chonggui's mother
Royal Consort Jeongbi An (died 1428), consort of Gongmin of Goryeo
Royal Consort Anbin Yi (1622–1693), concubine of Hyojong of Joseon

See also
Wang Baoming (455–512), posthumous name Empress An, Xiao Zhaoye's mother